Robert Louis Guiling (born 14 October 1980) is a Gibraltarian footballer who plays for Manchester 62, where he plays as a midfielder. Between 2013 and 2017, he represented the Gibraltar national team.

International career
Guiling made his international debut with Gibraltar on 19 November 2013 in a 0–0 home draw with Slovakia. This was Gibraltar's first game since being admitted to the UEFA

References

External links

 

1980 births
Living people
Gibraltarian footballers
Gibraltar international footballers
Association football midfielders
Lincoln Red Imps F.C. players
Lynx F.C. players
Gibraltar Premier Division players